MOL Enterprise was a Panamax-type container ship owned by Mitsui O.S.K. Lines, a Japanese transport company that covers major worldwide services and destinations.

The ship was launched on 19 September 2003  and delivered to Mitsui on December 27, 2003, from the IHI Marine United Inc. shipyard at Yokohama. In 2015 she was renamed AL Enterprise and in 2017 Viktoria. She arrived at Chittagong on 7 March 2017 for scrapping.

References

External links 

 Containerships @ Mitsui O.S.K. Lines

2003 ships
Container ships
Ships built by IHI Corporation